Antonio García Navarro (born June 5, 1980) is a Spanish professional racing driver.

Single-seater career
After a childhood in karting, Madrid-born García began racing cars in Formula Renault Campus in 1997. In 1998 he moved to the new Open Fortuna by Nissan series. The series changed its name to World Series by Nissan in 1999 and in 2000, García was the series champion with Campos Motorsport. This success saw García have a part-time opportunity to race in International Formula 3000 in 2001 and make his sports car debut in the FIA GT Championship. In 2002 he returned full-time to World Series by Nissan, was a test driver for Minardi, and finished 12th in FIA GT. In 2003 he moved full-time to the European Touring Car Championship driving a Ravaglia Motorsport BMW to 8th place in points. He improved to 7th place with the same team in 2004. The series became the World Touring Car Championship in 2005 and he finished 9th in points.

In December 2014 it was announced that García would drive for China Racing in the 2014 Punta del Este ePrix in Uruguay, the third round of the 2014–15 Formula E season. He replaced Ho-Pin Tung who participated in the Abu Dhabi Gulf 12-hour race.

Sportscar career

García made his 24 Hours of Le Mans debut in 2006 but did not participate in any racing full-time. He returned to full-time action in 2007 competing in the Le Mans Series in the Team Modena Aston Martin DBR9, finishing 6th in points. García signed on with the Cheever Racing team in the Rolex Sports Car Series in 2008, but the team struggled with their new Coyote/Fabcar and García only finished 21st in points. He also participated in the 24 Hours of Le Mans in the factory Aston Martin Racing DBR9 which won the GT1 class. He drove for Brumos Racing in the 2009 24 Hours of Daytona, winning with teammates David Donohue, Darren Law, and Buddy Rice. He signed on with Corvette Racing to compete in the full season of the American Le Mans Series starting in 2009.

Beginning in 2012, García competed in some Rolex Sports Car Series events with Spirit of Daytona Racing.

García is a good friend of Formula One champion Fernando Alonso from their days together in karting. Alonso attended the 2009 24 Hours of Le Mans as a guest of García.

Racing record

Career summary

* Season still in progress.

Complete International Formula 3000 results
(key)

Complete European Touring Car Championship results
(key) (Races in bold indicate pole position) (Races in italics indicate fastest lap)

Complete World Touring Car Championship results
(key)

Complete 24 Hours of Le Mans results

24 Hours of Daytona results

Complete IMSA SportsCar Championship results
(key) (Races in bold indicate pole position) (Races in italics indicate fastest lap)

† Non-points event.

Complete Formula E results
(key) (Races in bold indicate pole position; races in italics indicate fastest lap)

References

External links
 
 
 

1980 births
Living people
Sportspeople from Madrid
Spanish racing drivers
24 Hours of Le Mans drivers
American Le Mans Series drivers
Rolex Sports Car Series drivers
International Formula 3000 drivers
FIA GT Championship drivers
World Touring Car Championship drivers
24 Hours of Daytona drivers
European Le Mans Series drivers
European Touring Car Championship drivers
FIA World Endurance Championship drivers
WeatherTech SportsCar Championship drivers
24 Hours of Spa drivers
Formula E drivers
Corvette Racing drivers
NIO 333 FE Team drivers
Aston Martin Racing drivers
W Racing Team drivers
Campos Racing drivers
BMW M drivers
Audi Sport drivers
CRS Racing drivers
RSM Marko drivers
Cheever Racing drivers
Durango drivers